Edward Lany, FRS (b Harrow 1667 – d Cambridge 1728) was Master of Pembroke College, Cambridge from 1707 until his death.

Lany entered Pembroke College, Cambridge in 1709. He graduated B.A. in 1687, M.A. in 1690 and D.D. in 1707. He became a Fellow of Pembroke in 1688, and was ordained in 1689. He held livings at Salle and Chrishall; and was a Chaplain to William III. He was also Vice-Chancellor of the University of Cambridge from 1707 to 1708.

Lany died on 9 August 1728.

References

1667 births
1728 deaths
People from Harrow, London
Vice-Chancellors of the University of Cambridge
Alumni of Pembroke College, Cambridge
Masters of Pembroke College, Cambridge
Fellows of Pembroke College, Cambridge
Fellows of the Royal Society
Honorary Chaplains to the King